The Boston City League is a high school athletic conference in District B of the Massachusetts Interscholastic Athletic Association. All schools are located in the neighborhoods of Boston.

Schools 
The following twenty-three schools are a member of the league. The teams are separated into two or three divisions (North, South and Central is sometimes used) depending on the number of schools participating.

References 

Massachusetts Interscholastic Athletic Association leagues
Sports in Boston